The American Women's College Hockey Alliance debuted in 1997-98. It was a program funded through the United States Olympic Committee/NCAA Conference Grant Program. The AWCHA organized and developed activities with collegiate women's varsity ice hockey teams, and helped to promote women's ice hockey at all NCAA levels. The first AWCHA Division I National Ice Hockey Championship was held in March 1998. The New Hampshire Wildcats defeated the Brown Bears by a 4-1 score, to become the first recognized national champion in women's college ice hockey. 
There were two more AWCHA National Championships and then the NCAA became involved. In August 2000, the NCAA announced it would hold its first Division I Women's Ice Hockey National Championship. The Minnesota Duluth Bulldogs captured the first NCAA Division I Women's Ice Hockey Championship, defeating the St. Lawrence Skating Saints by a 4-2 tally on March 25, 2001.

American Women's College Hockey Alliance champions

Prior to the NCAA establishing a women's ice hockey championship, the AWCHA held a championship from 1997-98 season to 1999-2000 season. Below are those champions.

1998 New Hampshire 
1999 Harvard 
2000 Minnesota

Awards

Laura Hurd Award

The Laura Hurd Award is given to the AHCA Women’s Ice Hockey College Player of the Year, for the best player in women's Division III (the Patty Kazmaier Award is given for Division I play).

References

College women's ice hockey in the United States